Mengni is a town and former minor Rajput princely state on Saurashtra peninsula, in Gujarat, western India.

History 
Mengni was a Fifth Class princely state, also comprising seven more villages, covering 35 square miles in the Halar prant of Kathiawar. It was ruled by Jadeja Rajput Chieftains.

It had a combined population of 3,354 in 1901, yielding a state revenue of 29,847 Rupees (1903-4, mostly from land) and paying a tribute of 3,412 Rupees, to the British.

Sources and external links 
 Imperial Gazetteer, on dsal.uchicago.edu

Princely states of Gujarat
Rajput princely states